Dawn Batterbee Miller is an author. She authored God's Family Tree, published in 1994 by Church Growth Institute and numerous articles published worldwide in various Christian periodicals. For several years she served as editor and publisher of Women in Ministry, a denominational women's paper. She is also a retired public school teacher and holds master's degrees in education and communication arts, with the Master of Arts in Communication from Michigan State University.

Her work has appeared in several publications including, Guidepost, World Vision, Focus on the Family, Christian Communicator, Cook Communications Ministries, Standard Publishing, and others.

Selected works 
God's Family Tree published by Church Growth Inst.
Pioneer Potpourri published by DocUmeant Publishing
Deep Wood Series—
Footprints Under the Pines by WinePress
 2nd Edition by DocUmeant Publishing
Lost in the Deep Woods by WinePress
 2nd Edition by DocUmeant Publishing

References

External links 
 Author's website
 

Living people
Year of birth missing (living people)
Date of birth missing (living people)
American Christian writers
Michigan State University alumni
Christian novelists
American historical fiction writers
American historical novelists
Women historical novelists
American women non-fiction writers
21st-century American women